Columbia Township may refer to the following places in the United States:

Arkansas
 Columbia Township, Randolph County, Arkansas

Indiana
 Columbia Township, Dubois County, Indiana
 Columbia Township, Fayette County, Indiana
 Columbia Township, Gibson County, Indiana
 Columbia Township, Jennings County, Indiana
 Columbia Township, Whitley County, Indiana

Iowa
 Columbia Township, Tama County, Iowa
 Columbia Township, Wapello County, Iowa

Kansas
 Columbia Township, Ellsworth County, Kansas

Michigan
 Columbia Township, Jackson County, Michigan
 Columbia Township, Tuscola County, Michigan
 Columbia Township, Van Buren County, Michigan

Minnesota
 Columbia Township, Minnesota

Missouri
 Columbia Township, Boone County, Missouri

Nebraska
 Columbia Township, Knox County, Nebraska

New Jersey
 Columbia Township, New Jersey (historical)

North Carolina
 Columbia Township, Pender County, North Carolina, in Pender County, North Carolina
 Columbia Township, Randolph County, North Carolina, in Randolph County, North Carolina
 Columbia Township, Tyrrell County, North Carolina, in Tyrrell County, North Carolina

North Dakota
 Columbia Township, Eddy County, North Dakota

Ohio
 Columbia Township, Hamilton County, Ohio
 Columbia Township, Lorain County, Ohio
 Columbia Township, Meigs County, Ohio

Pennsylvania
 Columbia Township, Pennsylvania

South Dakota
 Columbia Township, Brown County, South Dakota

Township name disambiguation pages